In algebraic geometry, the Fröberg conjecture is a conjecture about the possible Hilbert functions of a set of forms.

References

Algebraic geometry
Conjectures
Unsolved problems in geometry